Xylofagou ( []) is a sprawling Greek-Cypriot village situated close to the A3 Motorway between Dhekelia (Larnaca) and Paralimni / Agia Napa. It lies on the northern flank of a hill, on the edge of an area of a group of several similar villages known as the "Kokkinochoria" ("the red villages"), known for growing vegetables, especially potatoes, in red soil.

Etymology
"Xylo" is the Greek word for "wood". "fagou" roughly means "eater's". And the whole name roughly translates to "Woodeaters" Most of the village lies in Larnaca District.

Landmarks
The town is home to a  medieval Venetian watchtower.

Near Xylofagou is the Cave of the 40 Martyrs, where Christian soldiers sacrificed their lives in the 16th century to evade capture by the Ottomans.

To commemorate the essential part the potato played in the Community's establishment and growth, a 16-foot-tall potato statue nicknamed the "Big Potato" was erected in the village. The statue proved controversial, with some mocking its suggestive shape. Community leader George Tasou responded to the comments by stating “I'm not bothered because it’s brought publicity to our village, and I’m hoping it will promote the Cyprus potato around the world”.

Xylophagou Tower

Xylophagou Tower is a Venetian watchtower located in Pyrgos, south of Xylofagou.

References

Castles in Cyprus
Buildings and structures in Larnaca
Medieval architecture
 
Geography of Akrotiri and Dhekelia
Communities in Larnaca District